Stephen John Hunt is a British professor of sociology at the University of the West of England. Prior to his appointment at the University of West England in 2001, Hunt had taught at the Sociology Department at the University of Reading for thirteen years, as well as in the Religious Studies Department at the University of Surrey, Roehampton.

Hunt's primary research interests include the Charismatic movement, the "New" Black Pentecostal Churches and the "gay debate" in the Christian Churches.

He is the author of Alternative Religions: A Sociological Introduction,  (2003).  He is also the author of The Life Course: A Sociological Introduction, (2005)  Religion in Western Society, (2002)  and The Alpha Enterprise,(2004).  He also edited the work: Christian Millenarianism: From the Early Church to Waco.

Hunt is on the editorial board of Pentecostudies.

Education
PhD, University of Reading, 1995

Professional associations
Member, editorial board, Pentecostudies

Published works

Books
Alternative Religions: A Sociological Introduction, Farnham: Ashgate Publishing, October 2003, 268 pp, 
The Life Course: A Sociological Introduction, 10 February 2005, Palgrave Macmillan, 
Religion in Western Society: Sociology for a Changing World, Palgrave Macmillan, 20 March 2002, 
The Alpha Enterprise: Evangelism in a Post-Christian Era, Ashgate Publishing, October 2004, 
Christian Millenarianism: From the Early Church to Waco, Indiana University Press, 1 July 2001, Editor

Articles
'Acting the Part: Living History – Who Joins and Why?', Leisure Studies, 23: pp. 387–403, 2004.
'Saints and Sinners: The Role of Conservative Christian Pressure Groups in the Christian Gay Debate in the UK', Religion-on-Line, November 2003.
'The Alpha Programme: Some Tentative Observations', Journal of Contemporary Religion, 2003, 18 (1): 77–93.
'The Lesbian and Gay Christian Movement in Britain: Mobilization and Opposition', Journal of Religion and Society, 4, 2002: 1–18.
'Deprivation and Western Pentecostalism Revisited: The Case of "Classical" Pentecostalism', Pentecostudies, July 2002.
'Deprivation and Western Pentecostalism Revisited: The Case of Neo-Pentecostalism', Pentecostudies, July 2002.
'The "New" Black Pentecostal Churches: The Growth and Theology of the Redeemed Christian Church of God', Journal of the European Pentecostal Association, 2002.
The Redeemed Christian Church of God. Black Church Revival in the UK, Pneuma: The Journal of the Society for Pentecostal Studies, 2002.
'The Jesus Fellowship as a Total Institution', Communal Studies, 2002, (14) (4): 94–107
'"Neither Here Nor There": The Construction of Identities and Boundary Maintenance of West African Pentecostals', Sociology, 2002, 36 (1): 147–69.
'The "Health and Wealth" Gospel in the UK: Variations on a Theme', Culture and Religion, 3 (1), 2001: 89–104.
'The British Black Pentecostal "Revival": Identity and Belief in the "New" Nigerian Churches', Ethnic and Racial Studies, 24 (1) 2001: 104–24.
'Dramatising the "Health and Wealth Gospel": Belief and Practice of a Neo-Pentecostal "Faith" Ministry', The Journal of Beliefs and Values, 2000: .
'All Things Bright and Beautiful: The Rise of the Anglican Charismatic Church', Journal of Evangelical Theology, 13 (1) 2000: 16–34.
'The Neill Commission on Party Funding in Britain: Recommendations and Implications', Talking Politics, The Journal of the Politics Association 14 (2), January 2000.
'"Winning Ways"': Globalisation and the Impact of the Health and Wealth Ministries', Journal of Contemporary Religion, 2000.

See also 
 Charismatic Christianity
 Neuro-linguistic programming
 New religious movements
 Pentecostalism
 Prem Rawat
 Religion and sexuality
 Sociology of religion

References

External links
Profile, at University of the West of England

Living people
British sociologists
Sociologists of religion
Researchers of new religious movements and cults
Academics of the University of the West of England, Bristol
Alumni of the University of Reading
Academics of the University of Surrey
Year of birth missing (living people)
Academics of the University of Reading